Radio Sunlight was a community radio station serving the Medway towns in Kent, England.

History
The station originally started broadcasting online in 2006, run by local Medway charity the Sunlight Development Trust. OFCOM awarded the Trust the licence to broadcast on FM in 2009, with transmissions starting 27 March 2012 on 106.6FM.

In 2016, Sunlight Development Trust made the decision to change format from FM broadcast to Internet broadcast. The FM licence was not renewed and Radio Sunlight ceased broadcasting on 19 February 2016 while, at the same time, transitioning to its new format as an Internet-based local community radio station.

References

External links
 Radio Sunlight

http://live.canstream.co.uk:8000/sunlight.mp3.m3u

Radio stations in Kent
Radio stations established in 2012
Radio stations disestablished in 2016
Community radio stations in the United Kingdom
Medway
Defunct radio stations in the United Kingdom